Cophoscincopus greeri is a species of lizard in the family Scincidae. It is found in western Africa.

Etymology
The specific name, greeri, is in honor of Australian herpetologist Allen Eddy Greer.

References

Cophoscincopus
Reptiles described in 2000
Taxa named by Wolfgang Böhme (herpetologist)
Taxa named by Andreas Schmitz
Taxa named by Thomas Ziegler (zoologist)